Hans "Måsen" Åström (born 28 November 1968) is a retired Swedish bandy player who played as a forward. Åström was brought up by Bollnäs GIF but only played in the first team for one season in his original spell although he did return later in his career. Hans has represented the Swedish national bandy team. A cousin of Prince Daniel, Duke of Västergötland, his mother Anna-Britta is a sister of Prince Daniel's father. He is also a godfather to Prince Oscar, second child of the Prince Daniel and Princess Victoria of Sweden.

External links 
 Hans Åström at bandysidan.nu 
 Hans Åström at bandybyn.se Edsbyns IFs official webpage 
 The Christening of Prince Oscar, Duke of Skåne Swedish Royal Court official webpage 

1968 births
Living people
Place of birth missing (living people)
Swedish bandy players
Bollnäs GIF players
Edsbyns IF players
Sandvikens AIK players
Sweden international bandy players
Bandy World Championship-winning players